Milperra Colts Junior Rugby League Football Club is an Australian rugby league football club based in Milperra, New South Wales. They have teams for both junior, senior men and women  and women tag teams.

Notable Juniors
Greg Barwick (1988-95 Canterbury Bulldogs, Penrith Panthers & Sydney Tigers)
Steve Price (1996-99 St George Dragons & Balmain Tigers)
Justin Holbrook (1999-02 Newcastle Knights, Penrith Panthers & Sydney Roosters)
Daniel Heckenberg (2000-02 St George Illawarra Dragons, Parramatta Eels & Manly Sea Eagles)
Trent Cutler (2005-11 Canterbury Bulldogs)
Tim Winitana (2007-10 Canterbury Bulldogs)
Jayden Okunbor (2019 Canterbury Bulldogs)

See also

References

External links
 

Rugby league teams in Sydney
Rugby clubs established in 1970
1970 establishments in Australia